James Edwards Sewell (181029 January 1903) was an English academic, Warden of New College, Oxford, from 1860.

Life
Sewell was educated at Winchester College and New College. In 1830, he became a Fellow of New College, and practically passed the rest of his life there, being elected to the headship in 1860. The first University Commission had just released the colleges from the fetters of their original statutes, and Sewell was called on to determine his attitude towards the strong reforming party in New College.

Though himself instinctively conservative, he determined that it was his duty to give effect to the desire of the majority, with the result that New College led the way in the general reform movement, and from being one of the smallest became the second largest college in Oxford. Sewell was vice-chancellor of the University of Oxford 1874–78.

He died in his ninety-third year, having been Warden of New College for 43 years, and was interred in the college cloisters.

Family
His brother, Henry Sewell became the first premier of New Zealand. Another brother, William Sewell, was a writer, as was sister Elizabeth Missing Sewell. His brother Richard Clarke Sewell was a barrister and later reader in law to the University of Melbourne and author of a large number of legal works.

References

Sources

1810 births
1903 deaths
People educated at Winchester College
Alumni of New College, Oxford
Fellows of New College, Oxford
Wardens of New College, Oxford
Vice-Chancellors of the University of Oxford